Kirinia is a genus of butterflies of the family Nymphalidae found in Europe and Asia.

Species
Listed alphabetically:
 Kirinia climene
 Kirinia epaminondas
 Kirinia epimenides
 Kirinia eversmanni (Eversmann, 1847) Kazakhstan, Ghissaro-Darvaz, Pamiro-Alai 
 Kirinia roxelana

References

External links
Satyrinae of the Western Palearctic
"Kirinia Moore, 1893" at Markku Savela's Lepidoptera and Some Other Life Forms

 
Butterfly genera
Taxa named by Frederic Moore